The Kelley Deal 6000 was an alternative rock band formed in St. Paul, Minnesota and was active between 1995 and 1997. They were formed by Kelley Deal in 1995, while her main band The Breeders was on hiatus and after she had just completed a stint in rehab. The band released two albums in 1995 and 1997, before Kelley went back to rejoin The Breeders the following year.

History
The band was formed in 1995 by Kelley Deal, lead guitarist of The Breeders, after she left drug rehab in St. Paul, Minnesota. The band's original line-up included Kelley on guitar and vocals, Marty Nedich on bass, Steve Salett on guitar, and Nick Hook on drums.

The band's first album, Go to the Sugar Altar, was funded by Deal and released on her own label, Nice Records. After the release, the band toured the US and Europe, changing their guitarist to Todd Mund during the tour.

In February 1997, the band worked on their second album, Boom! Boom! Boom!. For the new album Nick Hook was replaced by Todd Johnson. The album was released in August 1997.

After touring the album the band went on hiatus, with Deal becoming a full-time member of her sister's band The Breeders.

Discography
 Go To The Sugar Altar (1996), Nice Records
 Boom! Boom! Boom! (1997)

External links
 Official Kelley Deal Website - http://kelleydeal.net/archive.htm

References

Alternative rock groups from Minnesota
Musical groups established in 1995
Musical groups disestablished in 1997